Cape Newenham LRRS Airport  is a military airstrip located one nautical mile (1.2 miles; 1.9 km) southeast of Cape Newenham, in the Dillingham Census Area of the U.S. state of Alaska. It is not open for public use.

Overview
Cape Newenham Airport is a United States Air Force military airstrip. Its mission is to provide access to the Cape Newenham Long Range Radar Station for servicing and other requirements.

The airstrip was constructed in 1951 during the construction of the Cape Newenham Air Force Station. During the station's operational use as a manned radar station, it provided transportation for station personnel and for supplies and equipment to be airlifted to the station. With the manned radar station's closure in 1983, the airstrip now provides access to the unattended site for maintenance personnel and other requirements.

It is not staffed by any support personnel, and is not open to the public. During the winter months, it may be inaccessible due to the extreme weather conditions at the location.

The statement above is not correct: The site is no longer staffed by military personnel. A civilian contractor has a rotating staff of between four and six persons at the site for maintenance and operations and a traveling maintenance staff for less routine services.  The runway has an instrument approach and weather station and is kept open year round, except during snow removal and grading/compacting, as it is the main method of transporting personnel, supplies and food.

Facilities and aircraft 
Cape Newenham LRRS Airport has one runway designated 14/32 with a gravel surface measuring 3,950 by 150 feet (1,204 x 46 m). For the 12-month period ending August 2, 1978, the airport had 1,024 aircraft operations, an average of 85 per month: 98% air taxi and 2% military.

Statistics

References

External links 
 Aerial photo of runway
 

Airports in the Dillingham Census Area, Alaska
Military installations in Alaska